The Mellor Strata is a minibus body manufactured by Mellor Coachcraft since 2016 on Mercedes-Benz Sprinter chassis. It is available as the Mellor Strata HF 16, a step-entrance version aimed at the access bus market, so named for its maximum seated passenger capacity of sixteen; or as the Mellor Strata LF, a low-floor variant targeting the service bus market, with a capacity of up to 21 seated passengers.

The light and economical van-based Strata was launched to compete with the more traditional, but heavier and less economical, bus-based short wheelbase Alexander Dennis Enviro200 MMC and Optare Solo SR, as well as other van-based minibus designs, as the United Kingdom bus market was starting to go through the 'second minibus revolution' of the mid to late 2010s.

The Strata LF is built on the long-wheelbase Mercedes-Benz Sprinter 516 CDI chassis, while the Strata HF 16 is available on both the 514 CDI (with a less powerful engine) and 516 CDI variants of the Sprinter.

Since 2018, Mellor have offered two longer versions of the Strata, the 8.1m Strata Plus and the 8.7m Strata Ultra. The first Strata Ultra was delivered in 2019.

Operators

Strata HF 16 
The first two Strata HF 16s were delivered to Melksham Community Transport in early 2017. East Riding of Yorkshire Council have placed the largest order for Strata HF 16s to date, taking delivery of nine examples in July 2017.

Strata LF 
The first two Strata LFs entered service with McGill's Bus Services in late 2016 on their Inverclyde network.

The Strata LF has seen strong sales with local councils for community transport operations, with deliveries going to Dumfries & Galloway Council's SWestrans operation (three examples, leased to Houston's Coaches of Lockerbie); Nottinghamshire County Council (two examples); and Redcar and Cleveland Council (three examples). Additionally, a single Strata LF has been delivered to Cheshire West and Chester Council and leased to Stagecoach Merseyside & South Lancashire for operation on the Blacon Greyhound community bus service between Blacon and the Greyhound Retail Park in Chester.

The first order from a major group came in 2017, with Arriva North West taking delivery of nine Stratas for services in Macclesfield and Winsford in Cheshire. Rotala Group operations Preston Bus and Diamond Bus have also ordered a number of these model for their Ribble Valley operations and Transport for West Midlands tendered contracts.

See also 
Competitors:
Alexander Dennis Enviro200 MMC
Optare Solo SR
Wright Streetlite

Other contemporary Mellor products:
Mellor Maxima
Mellor Orion
Mellor Tucana II

References 

Mercedes-Benz vehicles
Mellor Coachcraft
Minibuses